L'ebreo (The Hebrew) is an 1855 opera by Giuseppe Apolloni to a libretto by Antonio Boni. It premiered on 25 January 1855 at La Fenice, Venice.

Plot
The setting is the siege of Granada in the last years of the reconquest of Spain by Ferdinand of Aragon and Isabella of Castile. Issachar, the titular Hebrew, is the magician of muslim King Boabdil, whom he betrays hoping to obtain freedom under the Spanish for his people. His daughter, Leila is in love with his enemy, the general Adèl-Muza. Issachar joins the Spanish but the Inquisition sentence him to the stake. He escapes by setting fire to the Spanish camp. Leila is taken to Ferdinand and Isabelle, who seek to convert her. At her baptism of the girl her father appears and stabs her, as she dies Adèl-Muza then reveals himself. Both the magician and the Moorish general are sentenced to the stake.

Recordings
Simone Alaimo (Issàchar), Fernanda Costa (Leila), Dino Di Domenico (Adèl-Muza), Armando Caforio (Ferdinando), Paola Bidinelli (Isabella), Francesco Piccoli (Boabdil, Gran Giudice) Orchestra Sinfonica di San Remo e Coro 'Francesco Cilea' di Reggio Calabria cond. Massimo De Bernart, Bongiovanni 1989

References

External links
Libretto

1855 operas
Italian-language operas
Operas set in the 15th century
Operas set in Spain
Operas